This is the list of the railway stations in Lombardy owned by:
Rete Ferroviaria Italiana, a branch of the Italian state company Ferrovie dello Stato
 Ferrovienord
 Ferrovie Emilia Romagna (FER).

RFI stations

Ferrovienord stations

FER stations

See also

Railway stations in Italy
Ferrovie dello Stato
Rail transport in Italy
High-speed rail in Italy
Transport in Italy

References

External links

 
Lombardy